The Miles Hawk Major was a 1930s British two-seat light monoplane, developed by Miles Aircraft from the Miles Hawk in order to take advantage of the new inverted de Havilland Gipsy Major engine. When fitted with the longer Gipsy Six in place of the forward crew member, it was known as the Miles Hawk Speed Six.

Design and development
The Hawk Major was a variant of the Miles M.2 Hawk, developed by F.G. Miles to take advantage of the new inverted de Havilland Gipsy Major engine. Other changes included metal (instead of wood) engine mounts and streamlined undercarriage. The production Hawk Major had the 130 hp de Havilland Gipsy Major engine. The aircraft sold well to private owners, including two that were fitted with smoke generators to allow them to be used as skywriters. An improved version (the M.2H) with a trailing edge flap replaced the M.2F on the production line. A number of special one-off racing versions were also built.

Operational history
The prototype M.2F Hawk Major) was first flown in 1934 and went on to second place in the 1934 King's Cup air race at an average speed of 147.78 mph.

In October 1934, Squadron Leader Malcolm Charles McGregor flew a Hawk Major from RAF Mildenhall to Melbourne, Australia in 7 days, 15 hours while competing in the MacRobertson Air Race.

Variants
M.2F Hawk Major
Production version powered by a de Havilland Gipsy Major engine.
M.2G Hawk Major
Three-seat cabin version, one built.
M.2H Hawk Major
Production version powered by a de Havilland Gipsy Major engine.
M.2K Hawk Major
Powered by a 105 hp Cirrus Hermes II engine, one built.
M.2M Hawk Major
Three-seat version powered by a de Havilland Gipsy Major engine, two built.
M.2P Hawk Major
Dual control version powered by a de Havilland Gipsy Major engine, three built.
M.2R Hawk Major de Luxe
Racing version powered by a de Havilland Gipsy Major engine, two built.
M.2S
Long-range version Powered by a 150 hp Blackburn Cirrus Major engine.
M.2T
Long-range single-seater powered by 150 hp Blackburn Cirrus Major engine, two built.

Hawk Speed Six

A racing version was developed with a 200 hp de Havilland Gipsy Six engine. To make room for the longer, six-cylinder engine the front cockpit was removed, making it a single-seater, and the rear cockpit was repositioned to retain balance. The type became known as the Miles Hawk Speed Six.

Only three were built, each tailored to the buyer's requirements, but they has a significant impact on the Golden Age of British air racing.

Hawk Trainer

In 1935, an improved version for training use was developed as the Miles Hawk Trainer.

Survivors
M.2H Hawk Major registered G-ADAS and flying from Museu TAM, São Carlos, São Paulo, Brazil. This is the only Hawk major in flying condition.
M.2H Hawk Major (DG590) (Civilian Registration was G-ADMW) at Montrose Air Station Heritage Centre, Montrose, Angus, Scotland, under restoration as of 2020.
M.2L Speed Six G-ADGP is airworthy in 2020 and in the Shuttleworth Collection based at Old Warden.

Operators

Royal Air Force

Aeronáutica Militar

Specifications (M.2F)

See also

References

Notes

Bibliography
 Amos, Peter (2009) Miles Aircraft – The Early Years – The Story of F G Miles and his Aeroplanes 1925-1939 (Air-Britain (Historians) Ltd, Tonbridge, Kent, ISBN 978 0 85130 410 6.
 
 
 

1930s British sport aircraft
Hawk Major
Single-engined tractor aircraft
Aircraft first flown in 1934